

Portugal
 Angola – António Álvares da Cunha, Governor of Angola (1753–1758)
 Macau –
 D. Rodrigo de Castro, Governor of Macau (1752–1755)
 Francisco Antonio Pereira Coutinho, Governor of Macau (1755–1758)

Colonial governors
Colonial governors
1755